Tom Dugan (born 1961) is an American theater, film and television actor who appeared in nearly 50 films and television series since 1986.

Life and career
Tom Dugan grew up in Winfield Township, New Jersey and studied theater at Montclair State University. Dugan has been professionally acting in Los Angeles for over 25 years and is the 2011 Los Angeles Drama Critics Circle Award-Winner for Best Solo Performance for his work as Simon Wiesenthal in Wiesenthal.

An LA Times Critics' Pick for 2010, Tom Dugan wrote and starred in one-man historical plays Robert E. Lee - Shades of Gray and Wiesenthal, and wrote and directed Frederick Douglass - In the Shadow of Slavery and The Ghosts of Mary Lincoln. Dugan often plays in the area of one-person shows, and has had as many as five shows in production simultaneously. His regional theatre work includes leading roles in The Man Who Came to Dinner, Misery, Amadeus and The Voice of the Prairie. He has also starred in national tours of Oscar to Oscar and On Golden Pond with Jack Klugman, along with national tours of his own plays including Robert E. Lee – Shades of Gray and Wiesenthal. Dugan is a member of the Colony Theatre in Los Angeles, CA, Theater 40 in Beverly Hills, CA, Theatrical Arts International, SAG/AFTRA, and Actors Equity. Accolades for Dugan include three nominations for the 2011 Los Angeles Ovation Awards, for his work in Wiesenthal, and the 2003 Inland Theater League Best Actor Award.

In films, he appeared as Chamberlain from the horror action film Hellraiser: Bloodline (1996), the Surgeon from The Cutting Edge: Going for the Gold (2006) film and Orange Country Man in Pro-Choice (2006). He also appeared as an arms dealer in P.U.N.K.S. (1999), and an operator in The Puppet Masters (1994). Dugan's television and film credits include Bones, Friends, Curb Your Enthusiasm, The Practice, Even Stevens, Chicago Hope, Santa Barbara, Sunset Beach, Just Shoot Me!, Kindergarten Cop and Dave.

Filmography
 1986 Odd Jobs as Lester
 1986 Thunder Run as Wolf
 1988 Perfect Victims as Brandon Poole
 1988 The Naked Gun: From the Files of Police Squad! as Drug Dealer #2
 1989 Brothers in Arms as William
 1989 Bill & Ted's Excellent Adventure as Neanderthal #2
 1989 Ghostbusters II as Restaurant Cop #1
 1989 Nightwish as Wendall
 1990 Lisa as Mr. Adams
 1990 Marked for Death as Paco
 1990 Kindergarten Cop as Crisp's Lawyer
 1992 Twogether as Paul
 1993 Dave as Jerry
 1993 Beethoven's 2nd as Hot Dog Vendor
 1994 Dangerous Touch as Freddie
 1994 Menendez: A Killing in Beverly Hills (TV) as Lyle's Jury: Juror #4
 1994 A Friend to Die For (TV) as Public Defender
 1994 The Puppet Masters as Operator #1
 1994 Junior as Lobster Man
 1995 Stuart Saves His Family as Ajax Spokesman
 1995 Leprechaun 3 as Art
 1996 If Looks Could Kill (TV) as Lance Herflin
 1996 Hellraiser: Bloodline as Chamberlain
 1996 White Cargo as Robert
 1996 Galgameth as William
 1998 I've Been Waiting for You (TV) as Ted Rankin
 1999 P.U.N.K.S. as Shareholder
 2000 The Trial of Old Drum (TV)
 2001 Race to Space as Reporter #2
 2003 The Even Stevens Movie (TV) as Keith
 2006 The Cutting Edge: Going for the Gold as Surgeon
 2006 Pro-Choice as Orange Country Man

References

External links

Living people
American male film actors
American male television actors
Male actors from New Jersey
Montclair State University alumni
People from Winfield Township, New Jersey
Date of birth missing (living people)
1961 births